Jones County is a county located in the U.S. state of North Carolina. As of the 2020 census, the population was 9,172, making it the fourth-least populous county in North Carolina. Its county seat is Trenton. Jones County is part of the New Bern, NC Metropolitan Statistical Area..

History
The county was formed in 1779 from the southwestern part of Craven County.  It was named for Willie Jones, a planter, slaveholder, Revolutionary leader and president of the North Carolina Committee of Safety during the war. He opposed state ratification of the United States Constitution and refused to vote on it at the Hillsborough Convention.

The rural Low Country county was originally developed for plantations, which were dependent on the labor of enslaved African Americans. The county's has heavily relied on agriculture (mostly tobacco) and lumber from its nearby forest.

In 2004, the county's population slightly rose above 10,000 in a census estimate but has since decreased to 9,172 in the 2020 Census count.

Geography

National protected area
 Catfish Lake South Wilderness (part)
 Croatan National Forest (part)

State and local protected areas
 Croatan Game Land (part)
 Hofmann Forest (part)

Major water bodies 

 Beaverdam Creek (Trent River tributary)
 Catfish Lake
 Trent River

Adjacent counties
 Craven County - northeast
 Carteret County - southeast
 Onslow County - south
 Duplin County - west
 Lenoir County - northwest

Major highways
  (Concurrency with US 70)

Major infrastructure 
 Oak Grove OLF, small military base near Pollocksville

Demographics

2020 census

As of the 2020 United States census, there were 9,172 people, 4,045 households, and 2,644 families residing in the county.

2000 census
As of the census of 2000, there were 10,381 people, 4,061 households, and 2,936 families residing in the county.  The population density was 22 people per square mile (8/km2).  There were 4,679 housing units at an average density of 10 per square mile (4/km2).  The racial makeup of the county was 60.97% White, 35.87% Black or African American, 0.36% Native American, 0.15% Asian, 0.04% Pacific Islander, 1.70% from other races, and 0.92% from two or more races.  2.72% of the population were Hispanic or Latino of any race.

There were 4,061 households, out of which 31.70% had children under the age of 18 living with them, 52.20% were married couples living together, 15.20% had a female householder with no husband present, and 27.70% were non-families. 24.50% of all households were made up of individuals, and 11.40% had someone living alone who was 65 years of age or older.  The average household size was 2.53 and the average family size was 2.99.

In the county, the population was spread out, with 25.70% under the age of 18, 6.80% from 18 to 24, 26.90% from 25 to 44, 25.20% from 45 to 64, and 15.40% who were 65 years of age or older.  The median age was 39 years. For every 100 females there were 93.00 males.  For every 100 females age 18 and over, there were 89.90 males.

The median income for a household in the county was $30,882, and the median income for a family was $35,180. Males had a median income of $28,662 versus $19,536 for females. The per capita income for the county was $15,916.  About 14.20% of families and 16.90% of the population were below the poverty line, including 22.30% of those under age 18 and 16.70% of those age 65 or over.

Law, government and politics
Jones County is a member of the regional Eastern Carolina Council of Governments. The Jones County Government relies entirely upon an all volunteer (non-paid) fire department force segregated by geographic location(s). The Law Enforcement structure consists of one paid Pollocksville Police Chief, one paid Maysville Police Chief, and an elected Sheriff with a small (less than 25 person force) to handle law enforcement, detention, and emergency communications. The county government relies heavily on volunteer deputization. Emergency ambulance services consist of one full-time medical unit dispatched from the town of Trenton and relies heavily on other volunteer EMS personnel geographically scattered around the county to assist with a medical emergency. Additional EMS transportation vehicles are subsidized by EMS services provided by adjacent counties or private enterprises. There is no animal control unit. The County Detention Facility is a 21-bed (3 female) facility located in the basement of the county courthouse and the detention staff double up as the communications/911 emergency communications staff.

Recreation
Part of the Great Dover Swamp also lies within the county lines. Many enjoy boating and fishing activities as well as camping at the 17 Family Campground along Highway 17 north in Maysville. The Croatan National Forest offers hiking trails and wildlife viewing and the wide open spaces of fields and forests are a haven for outdoor enthusiasts.

Communities

Towns
 Maysville (largest town, Split between Jones and Onslow)
 Pollocksville
 Trenton (county seat)

Unincorporated communities
 Comfort
 Oak Grove

Townships
The county is divided into seven townships, which are both numbered and named:
 1 (White Oak)
 2 (Pollocksville)
 3 (Trenton)
 4 (Cypress Creek)
 5 (Tuckahoe)
 6 (Chinquapin)
 7 (Beaver Creek)

See also
 List of counties in North Carolina
 National Register of Historic Places listings in Jones County, North Carolina
 Marine Corps Base Camp Lejeune, major military base in Jacksonville, Onslow County
 List of wilderness areas of the United States
 List of future Interstate Highways

References

External links

 
 
 NCGenWeb Jones County - free genealogy resources for the county

 
New Bern micropolitan area
1779 establishments in North Carolina
Populated places established in 1779